Champagne-sur-Oise (literally Champagne on Oise) is a commune in the Val-d'Oise department in Île-de-France in northern France. Champagne-sur-Oise station has rail connections to Persan, Creil, Pontoise and Paris.

Geography

Climate

Champagne-sur-Oise has a oceanic climate (Köppen climate classification Cfb).

Population

See also
Communes of the Val-d'Oise department

References

External links

Official website 

Association of Mayors of the Val d'Oise 

Communes of Val-d'Oise